Bouéni is a commune in the French overseas department of Mayotte, in the Indian Ocean.

Geography 
The commune of Bouéni, includes several villages :
 Moinatrindri
 Hagnoundrou
 Majiméouni
 Bambo-Ouest
 Mzouazia
 Mbouanatsa

History

Education 

 Collège de Bouéni

References

Populated places in Mayotte
Communes of Mayotte